The 1888 New York Giants season was the franchise's sixth season.

Claiming six future Hall of Famers (Roger Connor, Mickey Welch, Buck Ewing, Tim Keefe, Jim O'Rourke, and John Montgomery Ward), the team won the National League pennant by nine games and defeated the St. Louis Browns in the "World's Championship."

Keefe led the league in several major statistical categories, including wins, winning percentage, strikeouts, and earned run average.

Regular season

Season standings

Record vs. opponents

Roster

Player stats

Batting

Starters by position 
Note: Pos = Position; G = Games played; AB = At bats; H = Hits; Avg. = Batting average; HR = Home runs; RBI = Runs batted in

Other batters 
Note: G = Games played; AB = At bats; H = Hits; Avg. = Batting average; HR = Home runs; RBI = Runs batted in

Pitching

Starting pitchers 
Note: G = Games pitched; IP = Innings pitched; W = Wins; L = Losses; ERA = Earned run average; SO = Strikeouts

Relief pitchers 
Note: G = Games pitched; W = Wins; L = Losses; SV = Saves; ERA = Earned run average; SO = Strikeouts

1888 World Series 

The Giants beat the American Association champion St. Louis Browns in the World Series, six games to four.

References 
1888 New York Giants season at Baseball Reference

New York Giants (NL)
San Francisco Giants seasons
New York Giants season
National League champion seasons
World Series champion seasons
New York Giants
19th century in Manhattan
Washington Heights, Manhattan